Agardhiellidae is a family of gastropods belonging to the order Stylommatophora.

Genera:
 Agardhiella Hesse, 1923
 Enneopupa Boettger, 1889

References

External links
 Harl J., Haring E., Asami T., Sittenthaler M., Sattmann H. & Páll-Gergely B. (2017). Molecular systematics of the land snail family Orculidae reveal paraphyly and deep splits within the clade Orthurethra (Gastropoda: Pulmonata). Zoological Journal of the Linnean Society. 181(4): 778-794

Stylommatophora
Gastropod families